Sargodha Tehsil , is an administrative subdivision of the Sargodha District in the Punjab province of Pakistan. The tehsil is subdivided into 62 Union Councils - 22 of which form the city of Sargodha.

Location 
Sargodha Tehsil is situated in Pakistani province of Punjab. It is connected to the M-2 by several interchanges at different locations. Directly east connected by the M-2 motorway are Lahore and the route to Rawalpindi and Islamabad.

Education

Notable educational institutes

Demographics 
According to the census of 1998, the population of tehsil was recorded as 1,081,000.

References

Sargodha District
Tehsils of Punjab, Pakistan
Populated places in Sargodha District